A list of films produced by the Israeli film industry in 1996.

1996 releases

Unknown premiere date

Awards

See also
1996 in Israel

References

External links
 Israeli films of 1996 at the Internet Movie Database

Lists of 1996 films by country or language
Film
1996